Spring Hill Methodist Church is a historic Methodist church on County Road 89 on the south side, approximately 750 feet west of the junction with County Rd. 49 in Spring Hill, Alabama.  The Greek revival church was built in 1841 by John Fletcher Comer, father of Alabama Governor B. B. Comer. It was added to the National Register of Historic Places in 1996.

References

Methodist churches in Alabama
Churches on the National Register of Historic Places in Alabama
National Register of Historic Places in Barbour County, Alabama
Greek Revival church buildings in Alabama
Churches completed in 1841
Churches in Barbour County, Alabama